(May 17, 1972 – April 19, 2000) was a professional wrestler who is best known for his appearances in WAR and NJPW. He also joined a short-lived stable known as Fighting Club G-EGGS, the stable included Manabu Nakanishi, Yuji Nagata, Brian Johnston and Yutaka Yoshie.

Death
On April 14, 2000, Fukuda suffered a fatal head injury during a match with Katsuyori Shibata in the Young Lion Cup Tournament after taking a flying elbow drop. He was rushed to the hospital but died five days later on April 19 due to a brain hemorrhage; he was 27 years old.

Fukuda had suffered a similar cerebral hemorrhage and undergone brain surgery in October of the prior year and was out of action for roughly four months as a result. He had also reportedly collapsed in-ring during his first match back, which was roughly two months before his death. According to reports regarding the match with Shibata, Fukuda never landed on his head during the match and took nothing more than a few stiff elbows to the head, the likes of which were normal in a New Japan opening match at the time.

The rest of the 2000 Young Lion’s Cup was dedicated to Fukuda's memory and was honored with a ten-bell salute and a tribute show in September of that year.

Championships and accomplishments
Wrestle Association "R"
WAR International Junior Heavyweight Tag Team Championship (1 time) - with Hiroyoshi Kotsubo
WAR International Junior Heavyweight Tag Team Championship Tournament (1997) - with Hiroyoshi Kotsubo

See also
 List of premature professional wrestling deaths

References

External links
Cagematch profile

1972 births
2000 deaths
20th-century professional wrestlers
Japanese male professional wrestlers
Accidental deaths in Japan
Sport deaths in Japan
Professional wrestling deaths
Sportspeople from Tochigi Prefecture
International Junior Heavyweight Tag Team Champions